Igembe North Constituency is an electoral constituency in Kenya. It is one of nine constituencies of Meru County. The constituency has seven wards, all of which elect councillors for the Nyambene County Council. The constituency was established for the 1988 elections. It was known as Ntonyiri Constituency before the 2007 elections.

Igembe North was one of four constituencies of the former Meru North District.

Members of Parliament

Locations and wards

References 

Constituencies in Meru County
Constituencies in Eastern Province (Kenya)
1988 establishments in Kenya
Constituencies established in 1988